The Flumpet is a hybrid brass instrument that shares the construction and timbral qualities of a trumpet and flugelhorn. The Flumpet was invented for Art Farmer by David Monette and is currently in production by Monette. The Flumpet is in the key of B♭.

Design

The Flumpet was designed in 1989 and borrows the three piston valve design of both the trumpet and flugelhorn and shares the same instrument length of a trumpet. The curves on the end of the Flumpet  have a resemblance to shepherd's crooks. The mouthpiece is deeply conical which tapers slightly, as opposed to the trumpet mouthpiece which has an extreme taper to create a bowl shape. The sound of the Flumpet is described as thicker and richer than a flugelhorn and more mellow and rounded than that of a trumpet. During its creation, metal-worker David Monette wanted to produce an instrument that broke design barriers but ultimately maintained its usefulness.

The Flumpet has been described as "capable of both warmth and sharp attack", taking advantage of the softer sound produced by the flugelhorn, advantageous in smaller and more intimate venues, whilst still being capable of producing the more familiar harder tones of a trumpet. The tone has been described as having "characteristics of a flugelhorn, but not nearly as brittle.  It has the response of a cornet, but again the sound quality is broader and more resonant."

Notable players

 Art Farmer
 Charles Schlueter
 Scotty Barnhart
 Vince Jones
 Grandpa Flump

Recordings and performances

Made popular by the works of Art Farmer and The Art Farmer Septet, the Flumpet can be heard on his record Silk Road.

At a 1997 performance by Boston Symphony Orchestra, Charles Schlueter played the Flumpet in place of the post-horn solo of Mahler's Symphony No. 3.

Farmer also used the instrument on Haydn's trumpet concerto.

Film composer and musician Mark Isham played Flumpet on the soundtrack for the 1997 film Afterglow.

References

External links
 Monette site
 Example of flumpet playing

B-flat instruments
Brass instruments
Trumpets